Florida Airlines was a commuter airline based in Florida that operated from 1960 to 1982. It is said to have had the largest Douglas DC3 fleet in the world in 1976.
Airline deregulation eventually resulted in the demise of the airline.  The company slogan was The Florida Connection.

Fleet 

During the 1960s, Florida Airlines operated a fleet of aircraft described in the below table. 

Florida Airlines also operated Martin 4-0-4 propliner aircraft during its existence.

History 
Florida Airlines was incorporated on February 8, 1960, as Florida Air Taxi, Inc. in Tampa, Florida with William Taylor as owner. Taylor had purchased the company in the early 1950s from L. A. Stevens. The name was changed to Florida Airlines, Inc. on October 17, 1969. In 1969, the airline was sold to Lee H. Hill, Sr. and Lee H. Hill, Jr., owners of Hill-Donnelly Publishing company. In late 1973, it was sold by Hills to Arthur C. Allyn. Allyn had previously owned the Chicago White Sox and Executive Airlines. He was also the owner of Sarasota Jungle Gardens and a significant philanthropist in the Sarasota area. In 1975, the airline was purchased by Air South and Shawnee Airlines. The airline filed for Chapter 7 bankruptcy protection and suspended services in January 1980. The airline re-commenced operations as Southern International Airlines (SIA), based at Sarasota in early 1980 (operating under the 'Air Florida Commuter' banner). On December 2, 1981, Southern International Airlines (SIA) operations were suspended. The corporation was dissolved on December 14, 1982

Destinations 

The cities that Florida Airlines served in the 1970s:
Miami
Fort Myers
Sarasota
Tampa
Gainesville
Tallahassee
Jacksonville
Ocala
Punta Gorda
Port Charlotte
Fort Lauderdale
 Rock Sound, Bahamas
 Georgetown, Bahamas

In addition, Shawnee  Airlines DeHavilland DHC-6 Twin Otter aircraft were operated on special commuter connection services from Orlando and Tampa to the former STOLPORT at Walt Disney World until 1982.

See also 
 List of defunct airlines of the United States

References

External links 

Airlines based in Florida
Airlines established in 1960
Airlines disestablished in 1982
Companies based in Tampa, Florida
Defunct airlines of the United States
Defunct companies based in Florida
1960 establishments in Florida
1982 disestablishments in Florida
Companies that filed for Chapter 11 bankruptcy in 1980